Helmhold III, Count of Schwerin (died 1295) was a German nobleman.  He was a son of Count Gunzelin III of Schwerin-Boizenburg and Margaret of Mecklenburg.  Helmhold III was the ruling Count of Schwerin-Neustadt and Marnitz from 1274 until his death.

Marriages and issue 
Helmold married twice.  His first wife was Mathilda (some sources call her Margaret; d. 1265), a daughter of Albert I, Duke of Saxony.  Together, they had three children:
 Gunzelin V
 Henry III
 Margaret, a nun in Zarrenthin Abbey

After Mathilda's death,  Helmold married Margaret, the daughter of Eric I, Duke of Schleswig.  This marriage remained childless.

References 
Georg Christian Friedrich Lisch: Zur Genealogie der Grafen von Schwerin und über den Verlauf der Grafschaft Schwerin, in: Jahrbücher des Vereins für Mecklenburgische Geschichte und Altertumskunde, vol. 15, essay 2, p. 23-42, Schwerin, 1850, Online
 Friedrich Wigger: Ueber die Stammtafel der alten Grafen von Schwerin, in: Jahrbücher des Vereins für Mecklenburgische Geschichte und Altertumskunde, vol. 34, essay 3, p. 55-140, Schwerin, 1869, Online

Counts of Schwerin
13th-century births
Year of birth unknown
1295 deaths
13th-century German nobility